Carex muricata,  the rough sedge or prickly sedge (a name it shares with other species), is a species of Carex found in Europe and western Asia as far as the Himalayas. It has been introduced elsewhere. Poorly studied, Carex muricata is considered a species aggregate. The aggregate has been subject to a great deal of taxonomic confusion over the years and has yet to be fully resolved.

References

muricata
Plants described in 1753
Taxa named by Carl Linnaeus